Lea Alaerts (born 6 April 1954) is a Belgian sprinter. She competed in the women's 100 metres at the 1976 Summer Olympics. She and her teammates, Regine Berg, Anne Michel and Rosine Wallez set the Belgian record in the 4 × 400 metres relay at the 1980 Summer Olympics in Moscow with a time of 3:30.7.

References

External links
 

1954 births
Living people
Athletes (track and field) at the 1976 Summer Olympics
Athletes (track and field) at the 1980 Summer Olympics
Belgian female sprinters
Olympic athletes of Belgium
Olympic female sprinters